An undergraduate degree (also called first degree or simply degree) is a colloquial term for an academic degree earned by a person who has completed undergraduate courses. In the United States, it is usually offered at an institution of higher education, such as a college or university. The most common type of these undergraduate degrees are associate degree and bachelor's degree. Bachelor's degree typically takes at least three or four years to complete. In some other educational systems, undergraduate education is post-secondary education up to the level of a master's degree; this is the case for some science courses in Britain and some long-cycle medicine courses in Europe. These degrees can be categorised as basic or first professional degrees.

Europe

United Kingdom
In the United Kingdom, a bachelor's degree is the most common type of "undergraduate degree". Some master's degrees can be undertaken immediately after finishing secondary education; however, these courses are usually extended versions of bachelor's degree programs, taking an additional year to complete. Most bachelor's degrees take three years to complete, with some notable exceptions, such as Medicine taking five years. Often students can initially enroll in a 4-year program then leave after three years and be awarded a bachelor's degree. Lastly, the Undergraduate Advanced Diploma (UGAdvDip or UGAD) is a FHEQ Level 6 award and it is considered as equivalent to a second bachelor’s degree or a Graduate Diploma.

Italy
In Italy, the laurea (formerly laurea triennale, meaning "three-year laurea") is the most common type of "undergraduate degree". It is equivalent to a bachelor's degree and its normative time to completion is three years (note that In Italy scuola secondaria superiore or Lyceum, high school, takes five years, so it ends at 19 years of age). Not to be confused with the old laurea—now called laurea magistrale—which typically used to last five or six years. To earn a laurea, the student must complete a thesis, but a less demanding one than required for the old laurea (typically, a non-research thesis). There is not necessarily a laurea course for every discipline. For instance, for disciplines as Medicine or Jurisprudence only laurea magistrale courses are provided.

North America
First professional degrees sometimes contain the word Doctor, but are still considered undergraduate degrees in most countries, including Canada. For example, the Doctor of Medicine (M.D.) program in Canada is considered an "undergraduate degree". However, in the United States, most first professional degrees are considered graduate programs by the U.S. Department of Education and require students to already possess an "undergraduate degree" before admission. These degrees are not research doctorates and are therefore not equivalent to the Doctor of Philosophy (Ph.D.) Many countries offer bachelor's degrees that are equivalent to American graduate degrees. For example, the Doctor of Medicine and Doctor of Osteopathic Medicine degrees offered in the U.S. are equivalent to the Bachelor of Medicine and Surgery (MBBS or MBChB) degree.

In the United States and sometimes in Canada, an associate degree is a two-year degree. It is occasionally undertaken as the beginning of a four-year degree. Some two-year college systems have articulation agreements with four-year institutions in their state, which specify which courses transfer without problems.

United States

Arizona 

The Arizona General Education Curriculum certification (AGEC), awarded for the completion of an Associate of Arts, Associate of Science, or Associate of Business degree, indicates the completion of all bachelor's degree lower-level course work and permits the student to transfer to any of the three state universities and several private universities as a third-year student or "junior".

To obtain an AGEC certification, one must:

 Complete all associate degree credits at regionally accredited colleges (no secondary (high) school credits accepted);
 Satisfy all their bachelor's degree Lower Division Credits and Courses;
 Meet credit transfer restriction guidelines;
 Maintain a minimum GPA of 2.0

Although an AGEC certification meets the requirements for the bachelor's degree Lower Level it may or may not meet any prerequisite requirements for any given degree program. Associate degrees with an AGEC certification are often custom tailored with electives to meet the prerequisite requirements for the program and university the student wishes to transfer to.

Virginia 

Virginia's community college has signed system-wide agreements, allowing students who graduate from one of the 23 community colleges with a transfer associate degree and a minimum grade point average to obtain guaranteed admission to more than 20 of the Commonwealth's four-year colleges and universities.

South America

Argentina 

Argentine higher education system is based on the Spanish higher education system, which is basically a Continental education system (in contrast to the model in the English-speaking world). During the University Reform of 1918, a series of reforms that took place in the Universidad de Córdoba that further changed the Argentine educational system.

Currently there are three levels:

 Tertiary degree: 1 to 2 years degrees aimed at producing highly specialised and trained workforce.
 Graduate degree: 4 to 6 years programs taught at universities offering licentiate, engineering and medical degrees.
 Post-graduate: Specialised and research-oriented courses and programs. With masters or doctorate degrees being offer depending on the program.

Bolivia 

Education in Bolivia, as in many other areas of Bolivian life, has a divide between Bolivia's rural and urban areas. Rural illiteracy levels remain high, even as the rest of the country becomes increasingly literate. This disparity stems partly from the fact that many children living in rural area ation[dubious – discuss] are not necessarily attributable to lack of funding. Bolivia devotes 23% of its annual budget to educational expenditures, a higher percentage than in most other South American countries, albeit from a smaller national budget. A comprehensive, education reform has made some significant changes. Initiated in 1994, the reform decentralized educational funding in order to meet diverse local needs, improved teacher training and curricula, formalized and expanded intercultural bilingual education and changed the school grade system. Resistance from teachers’ unions, however, has slowed implementation of some of the intended reforms (Contreras and Talavera, 2003).
Universidad Católica Boliviana Tarija, Unidad Académica Regional Tarija;
Universidad Católica Boliviana Cochabamba, Unidad Académica Regional Cochabamba;
Universidad Católica Boliviana Santa Cruz, Unidad Académica Regional Santa Cruz;
Unidad Académica Campesina-Carmen Pampa, Carmen Pampa; a satellite campus of the Catholic University of Bolivia

Brazil

For a better understanding of education levels in Brazil, it is necessary to understand the structure of the higher education in the country. The present Brazilian system is organized according to the law that establishes the guidelines and bases for national education – Law n. 9.394 of 20 December 1996.

The classification of institutions of higher education happens according to their academic organization, and the following names are possible: Universities, University Centers, Colleges and Integrated Schools, Colleges and Institutes and Centers of Technological Education.

The higher education courses have two different academic levels, known as Undergraduate or Post Graduation. These degrees, have subdivisions in which are distributed programs of higher education in Brazil, and they may be bachelors, licentiates, and associates, for Undergraduate levels.

As for specializations, there are MBAs, Post-MBAs programs and for Post-graduation there are academic master's, professional master's degrees and doctorates. At the undergraduate level, there are still community colleges and further education courses.

Diplomas and certificates

At the undergraduate level, the bachelor's degrees, licentiates and technologist, provide undergraduation diplomas, while colleges and Extension courses provide certificates of completion. The law formalizes a B.A., B.S., Licentiate or Technologist degrees, according to the student's education, and is prerequisite to begin a Postgraduate degree course.

In the Postgrad, only students graduating from Stricto Sensu courses, that is, academic or professional master's and doctoral degrees and are given the titles of Master or Doctor, respectively. For students of the Lato Sensu – specializations, MBA programs and Post-MBA programs – is given certificates of completion and the title Specialist.

Graduate degrees in Brazil are called "postgraduate" degrees.

 Lato sensu graduate degrees: degrees that represent a specialization in a certain area, and take from 1 to 2 years to complete. Sometimes it can be used to describe a specialization level between a master's degree and an MBA. In that sense, the main difference is that the Lato Sensu courses tend to go deeper into the scientific aspects of the study field, while MBA programs tend to be more focused on the practical and professional aspects, being used more frequently to business, management and administration areas. However, since there are no norms to regulate this, both names are used indiscriminately most of the time.
 Stricto sensu graduate degrees: degrees for those who wish to pursue an academic career.
 Masters: 2 years for completion. Usually serves as additional qualification for those seeking a differential on the job market (and maybe later a PhD), or for those who want to pursue a PhD. Most doctoral programs in Brazil require a master's degree (stricto sensu), meaning that a Lato Sensu Degree is usually insufficient to start a doctoral program. 
 Doctors / PhD: 3–4 years for completion. Usually used as a stepping stone for academic life.

Ecuador 

The National Polytechnic School (Spanish: Escuela Politécnica Nacional), also known as EPN, is a public university located in Quito, Ecuador.

EPN is known for research and education in the applied science, astronomy, atmospheric physics, engineering and physical sciences. The Geophysics Institute monitors over the countries volcanoes in the Andes Mountains of Ecuador and in the Galápagos Islands. EPN adopted the polytechnic university model that stresses laboratory instruction in applied science and engineering.

The Oldest Observatory in South America is the Quito Astronomical Observatory and is located in Quito, Ecuador. The Quito Astronomical Observatory, which gives the global community a Virtual Telescope System that is connected via the Internet and allows the world to watch by streaming, is managed by EPN.

National Polytechnic School houses an international team of seismologists and
volcanologists at the Geophysicics Institute  with the task of monitoring all the seismic activity in the county. Earthquakes are measured using observations from seismometers. The moment magnitude is the most common scale on which earthquakes larger than approximately 5 are reported for the entire globe. The more numerous earthquakes smaller than magnitude 5 reported by national seismological observatories are measured mostly on the local magnitude scale, also referred to as the Richter magnitude scale. There are many geologists who study the eruptive activity for the volcanoes in the country and observe volcanic eruptions, especially Tungurahua whose volcanic activity restarted on 19 August 1999, and is ongoing , with several major eruptions since that period, the last starting on 1 February 2014.

The Geophysics Institute at EPN monitors the Andean Volcanic Belt is a major volcanic belt along the Andean cordillera in Colombia, Bolivia, Peru, Ecuador, Chile and Argentina.

Católica University was founded as a university football team for Pontificia Universidad Católica del Ecuador, a Catholic university in Quito. In 1962, they won the inter-university championship. Soon after, they became a football club on 26 June 1963, under Liga Deportiva de la Universidad Católica.

Universidad San Francisco de Quito is a liberal-arts, non-profit, private university located in Quito, Ecuador. It was the first totally private self-financed university in Ecuador and the first liberal-arts institution in the Andean region.

Academically, USFQ ranks as one of the three-top universities (category A) in the ranking of Ecuadorian universities (being the only totally private university to qualify for the highest category), issued by the Ecuadorian Council of Evaluation and Accreditation of High Education (Consejo Nacional de Evaluación y Acreditación de la Educación Superior CONEA). In 2009, it was ranked first in Ecuador in relation to the number of peer-reviewed scientific publications.

The university now enrolls 5,500 students, 4,500 of whom are undergraduates. The university each year has about 100 indigenous students and 1000 international students participate in USFQ academic programs. USFQ has developed a scholarship program for indigenous students, offering full scholarships to the best students of public high schools throughout Ecuador. Although USFQ receives no funding from the government of Ecuador, its faculty comprises one-half of all the people in that nation who hold a doctorate.

USFQ main campus is located in Cumbayá, outside of Quito (capital city of Ecuador), where students use a library, education and research laboratories, classrooms, and seven restaurants. USFQ is the only university in the world that owns a campus in the Galapagos Islands, and a campus in the Yasuni Biosphere Reserve (Tiputini Biodiversity Station), one of Earth's most biodiverse area.

Chile 

Students can choose between 25 "traditional" universities (public or private) and 35 private ones. There is a single, transparent admission system used by 33 universities (all 25 "traditional" universities and eight private ones which joined in 2011). The test, called PSU, an acronym for University Selection Test (Prueba de Selección Universitaria) is designed and evaluated by the University of Chile, while the system itself is managed by the Ministry of Education (Ministerio de Educación).

The test consists of two mandatory exams, one in Mathematics and one in Language. There are also two additional specific exams, Sciences (including Chemistry, Physics and Biology fields) and History, depending on which undergraduate program the student wishes to apply to. The cumulative grade point average achieved during secondary school is also taken into account in the final admission score, as well as the student's relative position in his class and two previous promotions. Every university assigns different weightings to the results of the various exams for the various programs offered. Some universities may require additional (non-PSU) tests or personal interviews for admission to some programs. In 2010, a total of 250,752 persons took both mandatory PSU tests.

The University of Chile is the largest and oldest institution of higher education in Chile and one of the oldest in Latin America. Founded in 1842 as the replacement and continuation of the former colonial Royal University of San Felipe (1738) (Spanish: Real Universidad de San Felipe), the university is often called Casa de Bello (House of Bello) in honor of its first president, Andrés Bello. Notable alumni include two Nobel laureates (Pablo Neruda and Gabriela Mistral) and twenty Chilean presidents among many others.

The Universidad de Chile was formally opened on 17 September 1843. During this period, the university consisted of five faculties (facultades): Humanities & Philosophy, Physics Sciences & Mathematics, Law & Political Sciences, Medicine, and Theology. By 1931, the number of colleges had increased to six: Philosophy & Education Sciences, Legal & Social Sciences, Biology & Medical Sciences, Physical & Mathematical Sciences, Agronomy & Veterinary, and Fine Arts.

Almost all of Chile's presidents graduated from the University of Chile, including all of those in the 20th century with the exception of Eduardo Frei Montalva (Pontifical Catholic University of Chile), General Carlos Ibáñez del Campo, and former military dictator General Augusto Pinochet Ugarte.

Higher education in Chile in colonial times dates to 19 August 1622, when the first university in Chile, Santo Tomás de Aquino, was founded. On 28 July 1738, its name changed to Real Universidad de San Felipe, in honor of King Philip V of Spain.

The Pontifical Catholic University of Chile  (UC or PUC) is one of the six Catholic Universities existing in the Chilean university system and one of the two Pontifical Universities in the country, along with the Pontifical Catholic University of Valparaíso. It is also one of Chile's oldest universities and one of the most recognized educational institutions in Latin America. It ranks 1st in South America by QS ranking.

UC was founded on 21 June 1888, by the Santiago archbishop, to offer training in traditional professions (law) and in technological and practical fields such as business, accounting, chemistry, and electricity. Its first chancellor was Monsignor Joaquín Larraín Gandarillas, and at the very beginning, the university only taught two subjects, law and mathematics. Since it is a Pontifical University, it has always had a strong and very close relationship with the Vatican. On 11 February 1930, Pope Pius XI declared it a pontifical university, and in 1931 it was granted full academic autonomy by the Chilean government. UC is a private, urban, multi-campus university. It is one of the eleven Chilean Catholic universities, and one of the twenty-five institutions within the Rectors' Council (Consejo de Rectores), the Chilean state-sponsored university system. It is part of the Universities of the Rectors' Council of Chilean Universities, and although it is not state-owned, a substantial part of its budget is given by state transferences under different concepts.

UC's 18 faculties are distributed through four campuses in Santiago and one regional campus located in southern Chile. The technical training centers affiliated with the university are: DUOC, the Rural Life Foundations, the Baviera Foundation, the Catechetical Home and the San Fidel Seminary. These centers carry out technical-academic extension activities in rural and agricultural areas. Other UC activities are a Sports Club, a nationwide television network, and a Clinical Hospital dependent on the Faculty of Medicine.

UC 's Graduates of the School of Architecture (one of the most prominent in Latin America) have also made important contributions to the country with such work as the Central Building ("Casa Central") of UC, and the National Library. Two of its most important alumni are the Jesuit Saint Alberto Hurtado and Eduardo Frei Montalva, a Chilean president. Both of them studied in the School of Laws. Sebastián Piñera, previous Chilean president, graduated from the university's School of Economics.

Pontifical Catholic University of Chile ranks among the first 10 Latin-American Universities according to the Shanghai ranking, and is 1st according to the QS ranking.

UC has four campuses in Santiago and one campus in Villarrica. The campuses in Santiago are:
 Casa Central (in downtown Santiago)
 San Joaquín (in Macul Commune of Greater Santiago)
 Oriente (in Providencia Commune of Greater Santiago)
 Lo Contador (also in Providencia Commune)

These four campuses have a total of 223,326.06 m2 constructed in a 614,569.92 m2 area. The Villarrica campus has 1,664 m2 constructed in a 2,362.5 m2 area.

UC was founded on 21 June 1888, by the Santiago Archbishop, to offer training in traditional professions (law) and in technological and practical fields such as business, accounting, chemistry, and electricity. Its first chancellor was Monsignor Joaquín Larraín Gandarillas, and at the very beginning, the university only taught two subjects, law and mathematics. Since it is a Pontifical University, it has always had a strong and very close relationship with the Vatican. On 11 February 1930, Pope Pius XI declared it a pontifical university, and in 1931 it was granted full academic autonomy by the Chilean government.

UC is a private, urban, multi-campus university. It is one of the eleven Chilean Catholic universities, and one of the twenty-five institutions within the Rectors' Council (Consejo de Rectores), the Chilean state-sponsored university system. It is part of the Universities of the Rectors' Council of Chilean Universities, and although it is not state-owned, a substantial part of its budget is given by state transferences under different concepts.

UC's 18 faculties are distributed through four campuses in Santiago and one regional campus located in southern Chile. The technical training centers affiliated with the university are: DUOC, the Rural Life Foundations, the Baviera Foundation, the Catechetical Home and the San Fidel Seminary. These centers carry out technical-academic extension activities in rural and agricultural areas. Other UC activities are a Sports Club, a nationwide television network, and a Clinical Hospital dependent on the Faculty of Medicine.

UC 's Graduates of the School of Architecture (one of the most prominent in Latin America) have also made important contributions to the country with such work as the Central Building ("Casa Central") of UC, and the National Library.

Two of its most important alumni are the Jesuit Saint Alberto Hurtado and Eduardo Frei Montalva, a Chilean president. Both of them studied in the School of Laws. Sebastián Piñera, previous Chilean president, graduated from the university's School of Economics.

The Department of Industry and System Engineering is engaging Stanford Technology Venture Program of Stanford University on a collaboration on innovation and technology ventures.

In December 2011, the schools of engineering of PUC and the University of Notre Dame signed an agreement to establish a dual graduate degree in civil engineering and the geological sciences, which now extends to other departments in both schools.

In April 2013, PUC and the University of Notre Dame also signed a memorandum of understanding to strengthen scholarly engagement and expand their long-standing relationships. The agreement establishes an exchange program in which faculty, doctoral students and university representatives from each institution will visit, work, study and collaborate with the other institution.

Paraguay 

The Universidad Católica "Nuestra Señora de la Asunción" is a private university of Catholic obedience in Paraguay. It has 8 teaching facility centers.

The Universidad Nacional de Asunción, abbreviated UNA, is a public university in Paraguay. Founded in 1889, it is the oldest and most traditional university in the country. When the university just started it had only the Faculties of Law, Medicine and Mathematics, and schools of Clerk, Pharmacy and Obstetrics. Nowadays the UNA has 12 faculties and 2 institutes in 74 careers that take place in different areas of knowledge, offering students the most comprehensive range of vocational training opportunities. The academic community is made up of about 40,000 students and 6,200 teachers.

It also has several institutes and technology centers and research facilities that provide the academic community, both for conducting scientific research, and for the development of postgraduate studies, resulting in contributions to society. The university campus is spread throughout Paraguay, with centers in Pedro Juan Caballero, Caacupé, San Juan Bautista, Santa Rosa Misiones, Caazapá, Villarrica, Coronel Oviedo, Caaguazú, Paraguarí, Villa Hayes, San Pedro, San Estanislao, Cruce Los Pioneros (Boquerón) and Benjamín Aceval.

Peru 

Education in Peru is under the jurisdiction of the Ministry of Education, which is in charge of formulating, implementing and supervising the national educational policy. According to the Constitution, education is compulsory and free in public schools for the initial, primary and secondary levels. It is also free in public universities for students who are unable to pay tuition and have an adequate academic performance. As of 2008, various institutions such as UNESCO, World Bank, and the Inter-American Development Bank have stated that Peru has the best education system in Latin America and that primary, secondary, and superior education attendance rates were the highest in Latin America.
The Programme for International Student Assessment (PISA) has however placed Peru at the bottom of the ranking in all three categories (Math, science and reading) in 2012 compared to the 65 nations participating in the study of 15-year-old school pupils' scholastic performance.

Higher education in the form of universities began in Peru with the establishment of the Universidad Nacional Mayor de San Marcos by the Royal Decree issued by King Carlos V on 12 May 1551. The institute opened as the Sala Capitular del Convento de Santo Domingo in 1553. In 1571, it obtained Papal approval and in 1574 it received the name of Universidad Nacional Mayor de San Marcos. The precursor to the Universidad Nacional Mayor de San Marcos, the "Estudio General o Universidad", was established in Cusco by the Dominicans on 1 July 1548. This institution was responsible for teaching evangelists for the new lands, and taught scripture, theology, grammar, and the Quechuan language.

The National University of Saint Anthony the Abbot in Cuzco  (UNSAAC) is a public university in Cusco, Peru and one of the oldest in the country. Its foundation was first proposed on 1 March 1692, at the urging and support of Pope Innocent XII. The document in which Pope Innocent XII sponsored the founding of the university was signed in Madrid, Spain by King Charles II on 1 June 1692, thus becoming Cusco's principal and oldest university. The university was authorized to confer the bachelors, licentiate, masters, and doctorate degrees.

Pontifical Catholic University of Peru  (PUCP) is a private university in Lima, Peru. It was founded in 1917 by Catholic priest Father Jorge Dintilhac SS.CC as Peru's first non-profit private institution of higher learning. Academically, PUCP ranks alternatively as first or second in Peru.

In July 2012, after an Apostolic Visitation, begun earlier, in 2011, by Cardinal Peter Erdo, Archbishop of Esztergom-Budapest, Hungary, the Holy See withdrew from the university the right under canon law to use the titles Catholic and Pontifical in its name, but it was not possible because the legitimate law was the Peruvian Law. However, on Monday, 28 April 2014, the Rector of the university stated that,: "The Holy Father, Pope Francis, has formed a Commission of Cardinals with the mission of meeting to find a 'final, consensual solution,' in the framework of the Apostolic Constitution 'Ex Corde Ecclesiae,' ('From the Heart of the Church') to the outstanding issues" between the Vatican and the University." Besides Cardinal Erdo, the other two Cardinal Members of the Commission will be Cardinal Gerald Cyprien Lacroix, Archbishop of Quebec City, Quebec, Canada, and Cardinal Ricardo Ezzati Andrello, Archbishop of Santiago de Chile, Chile.

The University began activities in 1917 with two schools: Letters and Laws. In 1933, when the university had more than 500 students, the Schools of Engineering, and Political and Economical Sciences were established. In 1935, the School of Education was created. Later, in 1939, the Academy of Catholic Art was founded, with Adolf Winternitz as its director; the university is still one of only a small number to offer an arts major in Perú. During the 1960s, Gustavo Gutiérrez O.P., a Peruvian priest and an instructor at the university, developed the first principles of "Liberation Theology", promoting Marxist socialism and pan-Latin American solidarity.

There are currently 16,000 undergraduate students pursuing 38 different specialties in 10 schools. Its main campus is located in the Lima district of San Miguel, with the newly built Mac Gregor complex. Outside the main campus there are other facilities such as the IC (Idiomas Católica), a language-learning center, the Confucius Institute PUCP, the cultural center (CCPUCP) located in the district of San Isidro. CENTRUM, a center for business studies featuring doctoral level and MBA programs and located in the district of Santiago de Surco, is also part of PUCP. Inside, there is a Pastoral Counseling Center (CAPU). The Student body is made up of 17,064 Undergraduates and 4,917 Postgraduates and 57 Doctoral students as of 2013, 1014 school year.

Uruguay 

Education in Uruguay is compulsory for a total of nine years, beginning at the primary level, and is free from the pre-primary through the university level. In 1996, the gross primary enrollment rate was 111.7 percent, and the net primary enrollment rate was 92.9 percent. Primary school attendance rates were unavailable for Uruguay as of 2001.

There are three levels of postsecondary education:

 Tertiary Education level: 1 to 4 years degrees related to technical professions like teachers, professorship (Instituto de Profesores Artigas (IPA)), Technicians and Technologists (CETP, ex-UTU).
 University level: 4 to 7 years Professional education taught at universities such as the University of the Republic (Uruguay) and various private universities offering many different degrees like Licentiate, Engineering degree, Medicine degree, various Law degrees, etc.
 Post-graduate level: This is a specialized and research-oriented education level. It is divided in three levels: Specialist degree for both tertiary and university graduates, meanwhile master's degrees (both professional and academic oriented) and doctorates are for graduated university students.

The University of the Republic (Uruguay), (abbreviated UdelaR) is Uruguay's only public, state-owned university. It is the most important, oldest, and largest university in the country, with a student body of more than 130,000 students. It was founded on 18 July 1849, in Montevideo, where most of its buildings and facilities are still located. Its current Rector is Rodrigo Arim. 
The process of founding the country's public university began on 11 June 1833, when a law proposed by then-Senator Dámaso Antonio Larrañaga was passed. It called for the creation of nine academic departments; the president of the Republic would pass a decree formally creating the departments once the majority of them were in operation. In 1836 the House of General Studies was formed, housing the departments of Latin, philosophy, mathematics, theology and jurisprudence.

On 27 May 1838, Manuel Oribe passed a decree through which created the Greater University of the Republic. That decree had few practical effects, given the institutional instability of the Oriental Republic of the Uruguay at that time.

The Universidad Católica del Uruguay Dámaso Antonio Larrañaga is one of the many private universities in the country, and has seven schools: Humanities, Management, Law, Engineering and Technologies, Nursing, Dental School and Psychology. Its main campus is located in Montevideo (alongside six others), and some lesser ones are located in Maldonado and Salto.

See also
 British undergraduate degree classification

References

Academic degrees
Undergraduate education